SS John Einig was a Liberty ship built in the United States during World War II. She was named after John Einig, a former resident of Jacksonville, Florida, that had invented the  steam whistle nicknamed "Big Jim". Einig is also credited with building the first horseless carriage in Jacksonville, in 1896.

Construction
John Einig was laid down on 1 December 1943, under a Maritime Commission (MARCOM) contract, MC hull 1220, by the St. Johns River Shipbuilding Company, Jacksonville, Florida; she was sponsored by Helen Wrenn Early, wife of White House Press Secretary Stephen Early, and was launched on 14 January 1944.

History
She was allocated to the United States Navigation Co., on 31 January 1944. On 7 June 1946, she was laid up in the National Defense Reserve Fleet, Mobile, Alabama. She was sold, 31 December 1946, to Italy, for $544,506, for commercial use. She was removed from the fleet on 3 January 1947. John Einig was renamed Aida Lauro in 1947. She was scrapped in 1969.

References

Bibliography

 
 
 
 
 

 

Liberty ships
Ships built in Jacksonville, Florida
1944 ships
Mobile Reserve Fleet
Liberty ships transferred to Italy